United Artists Theatre, originally known as the Majestic Theatre, was a movie palace in Portland, Oregon, United States. It was the first establishment in Portland exclusively intended for motion picture screening.

History
The Majestic Theatre opened as Portland's first "palace" for motion pictures on June 10, 1911, at the northeast corner of Southwest Park Avenue and Washington Street. The venue contained 1,100 seats. It was originally owned by Edwin F. James.

In 1929, ownership transferred to J. J. Parker Theatres; the company renovated the venue and changes its name to United Artists Theatre. The building was designed by Bennes and Herzog, who are also credited for designing Portland's Hollywood Theatre. In addition, the interior was refitted. Mayor George Luis Baker spoke at the venue's rededication ceremony on September 29, 1928. The theatre closed in 1955 and was demolished in 1957. 

The site is now occupied by the Union Bank Tower (formerly known as the Bank of California building), built in 1967–1969.

References

External links

1911 architecture
1911 establishments in Oregon
1955 disestablishments in Oregon
1957 disestablishments in Oregon
Buildings and structures demolished in 1957
Cinemas and movie theaters in Oregon
Demolished buildings and structures in Portland, Oregon
Demolished theatres in Oregon
Southwest Portland, Oregon
Theatres in Portland, Oregon
Portland